Cranoglanis is the only genus of armorhead catfishes.

Taxonomy
Cranoglanis bouderius was first described as Bagrus bouderius in 1846 by John Richardson based on a Chinese watercolor painting. Wilhelm Peters later described Cranoglanis along with a new species, Cranoglanis sinensis. Otto Koller (1926) described a new species, Pseudotropichthys multiradiatus. George Myers (1931) synonymized Pseudotropichthys with Cranoglanis, as well as described the family Cranoglanididae. Jayaram (1955) synonymized C. multiradiatus and C. sinensis under C. bouderius. More recently, C. bouderius and C. multiradiatus have been treated as separate species. C. henrici, described by Léon Vaillant in 1893, is often overlooked, but is a valid species.

In 2005, Cranoglanis had been considered a monotypic genus by some, with C. bouderius as the only valid species.

The Cranoglanididae are closely related to the North American family Ictaluridae. These two families are sister taxa in the superfamily Ictaluroidea.

Species 
The five currently recognized species in this genus are:
 Cranoglanis bouderius (J. Richardson, 1846)
 Cranoglanis caolangensis V. H. Nguyễn, 2005
 Cranoglanis henrici (Vaillant, 1893)
 Cranoglanis multiradiatus (Koller, 1926)
 Cranoglanis songhongensis V. H. Nguyễn, 2005

Distribution and habitat
These fish are found in large freshwater rivers in China and Vietnam.

Appearance and anatomy
These fish have short dorsal fins. The caudal fins are deeply forked. The eyes are large. Their bodies are scaleless, though rough, bony plates are located on the tops of their heads. These fish have four pairs of barbels.

See also
List of fish families

References

Taxa named by Wilhelm Peters
Catfish of Asia
Catfish genera